Elk Run Heights is a city in Black Hawk County, Iowa, United States. The population was 1,069 at the 2020 census. It is part of the Waterloo–Cedar Falls Metropolitan Statistical Area.

History
Elk Run Heights was established in 1951.

Geography
Elk Run Heights is located at  (42.468587, -92.257290).

Elk Run Heights is a suburb of Waterloo.

Demographics

2010 census
As of the census of 2010, there were 1,117 people, 461 households, and 337 families living in the city. The racial makeup of the city was 94.6% White, 1.7% African American, 0.3% Native American, 0.1% Asian, 0.1% Pacific Islander, 0.5% from other races, and 2.7% from two or more races. Hispanic or Latino of any race were 2.5% of the population.

There were 461 households, of which 27.1% had children under the age of 18 living with them, 58.6% were married couples living together, 9.8% had a female householder with no husband present, 4.8% had a male householder with no wife present, and 26.9% were non-families. 21.9% of all households were made up of individuals, and 8.3% had someone living alone who was 65 years of age or older. The average household size was 2.42 and the average family size was 2.79.

The median age in the city was 44.1 years. 19.3% of residents were under the age of 18; 8.9% were between the ages of 18 and 24; 23% were from 25 to 44; 33.2% were from 45 to 64; and 15.6% were 65 years of age or older. The gender makeup of the city was 49.9% male and 50.1% female.

2000 census
As of the census of 2000, there were 1,052 people, 394 households, and 325 families living in the city. The racial makeup of the city was 97.53% White, 0.67% African American, 0.10% Native American, 0.10% Asian, 0.29% from other races, and 1.33% from two or more races. Hispanic or Latino of any race were 2.00% of the population.

There were 394 households, out of which 37.8% had children under the age of 18 living with them, 69.5% were married couples living together, 8.1% had a female householder with no husband present, and 17.3% were non-families. 13.2% of all households were made up of individuals, and 6.1% had someone living alone who was 65 years of age or older. The average household size was 2.67 and the average family size was 2.92.

Age spread: 25.8% under the age of 18, 7.0% from 18 to 24, 28.7% from 25 to 44, 24.0% from 45 to 64, and 14.4% who were 65 years of age or older. The median age was 39 years. For every 100 females, there were 103.1 males. For every 100 females age 18 and over, there were 100.8 males.

The median income for a household in the city was $45,179, and the median income for a family was $48,906. Males had a median income of $34,444 versus $25,000 for females. The per capita income for the city was $18,129. About 1.0% of families and 1.6% of the population were below the poverty line, including 2.1% of those under age 18 and none of those age 65 or over.

Education
The Waterloo Community School District serves the community.

References

External links 

 
City Data Comprehensive statistical data and more about Elk Run Heights

Cities in Black Hawk County, Iowa
Cities in Iowa
Waterloo – Cedar Falls metropolitan area
1951 establishments in Iowa